is a professional sumo wrestler from Almaty, Kazakhstan. He began his professional sumo career in November 2021 at the age of 24. After eight tournaments and two lower division championships he was promoted to the top makuuchi division, becoming the first Kazakhstani to do so. His highest rank to date has been maegashira 14. He wrestles for Kise stable.

Early life and education
Yersin originally practiced judo until the age of 18 when, at the suggestion of former yokozuna Asashōryū, he transferred to a high school in Japan to participate in amateur sumo wrestling. He then entered Nihon University and joined their sumo club. In 2019 he finished as the runner-up in the All-Japan Championships, and placed in the top 16 at that same tournament the following year.

Career
Upon graduating from university Yersin was urged to enter professional sumo, where he would be eligible to skip the lower two divisions and start at the rank of sandanme because of a dispensation given to amateur wrestlers who have finished in the top 8 in tournaments such as the All-Japan Championships. He joined Kise stable under the shikona of Kinbōzan, which is derived from Mount Kinbō in Kumamoto, the hometown of his stablemaster and former maegashira Higonoumi.

Kinbōzan's first tournament was the November 2021 basho in Kyushu, where he won all seven of his matches and took the sandanme championship, resulting in his promotion to makushita. At the March 2022 tournament in Osaka he won the makushita championship with a 7–0 sweep at the rank of makushita 34. He would work his way up the makushita rankings and eventually earn promotion to the second-highest jūryō division in September 2022. Following winning performances in three tournaments (including double digit wins in two of them) he was promoted to the top makuuchi division in March 2023, becoming the first wrestler from Kazakhstan to do so. At a press conference following his top division promotion, Kinbōzan said that he wanted to wrestle his own style of sumo, adding he was motivated to become stronger following a recent visit to Kazakhstan to visit his mother, who was unwell.

Fighting style
Kinbōzan primarily uses pushing and thrusting techniques, with most of his wins by way of oshidashi (frontal push out), yorikiri (frontal force out) and tsukidashi (frontal thrust out).

Career record

See also
List of active sumo wrestlers
List of non-Japanese sumo wrestlers
Glossary of sumo terms

References

External links

1997 births
Living people